Hattie Leslie (allegedly born Libbie Spahn; November 14, 1868 – September 28, 1892) was an American female boxer who fought against Alice Leary in the first US bout in 1888 in Buffalo. Hattie Leslie and Hattie Stewart were known as the "Female John L. Sullivan".

Hattie Leslie married John Leslie who later became her manager.

A bare-knuckle boxer, Hattie Leslie was inducted to the Bare Knuckle Boxing Hall of Fame in 2014.

She died of typhoid pneumonia on September 28, 1892, while on tour in Milwaukee.

References

Further reading
 Jennings, L. A. (2014). She's a Knockout!: A History of Women in Fighting Sports. Lanham, MD: Rowman & Littlefield.
 Smith, M. (2014). A History of Women's Boxing. Lanham, MD: Rowman & Littlefield.

1868 births
1892 deaths
American women boxers
Bare-knuckle boxers
Deaths from typhoid fever
Deaths from pneumonia in Wisconsin